Douglas "Dally" Duncan (14 October 1909 – 2 January 1990) was a Scottish football player and manager.

A left-winger, Duncan joined Hull City from Aberdeen Richmond in 1928 and spent his entire professional career in English football. He joined Derby County for £2,000 in 1932 and remained contracted to the club until 1946. During this period he earned 14 caps for the Scottish national team, scoring 7 goals between 1932 and 1937. He also received an FA Cup winners medal with Derby in 1946.

After "guesting" for Reading, Notts County and Nottingham Forest during World War II, Duncan moved to Luton Town as a player-coach in October 1946. He was appointed manager in June 1947 and retained the position until October 1958. He then managed Blackburn Rovers for two seasons, helping them to the FA Cup final in 1960. The Blackburn performance included a man of the match performance by Ally MacLeod.

Duncan ran a guest house in Brighton after his football retirement. He died in 1990, aged 80.

International goals 
Scores and results list Scotland's goal tally first.

References

External links 
 
 
 International stats at Londonhearts.com

1909 births
1990 deaths
Footballers from Aberdeen
Scottish footballers
Association football wingers
Hull City A.F.C. players
Derby County F.C. players
Reading F.C. wartime guest players
Notts County F.C. wartime guest players
Nottingham Forest F.C. wartime guest players
Luton Town F.C. players
Scotland international footballers
English Football League players
Scottish football managers
Luton Town F.C. managers
Blackburn Rovers F.C. managers
English Football League managers
FA Cup Final players